Michel Negroponte is an American producer and director.

Biography 
Negroponte was born to Catherine Coumantaros and Dimitrios Negrepontis, a Greek shipping magnate and alpine skier, and grew up in New York City's Upper East Side. He has three brothers - John (a former United States Deputy Secretary of State), George (President of the Drawing Center from 2002 to 2007) and Nicholas (founder of the Massachusetts Institute of Technology's Media Lab and of the One Laptop per Child project.)

The director studied filmmaking alongside filmmakers Richard Leacock and Ed Pincus at the Massachusetts Institute of Technology in the 1970s.

Negroponte has also pursued teaching careers in both graduate and undergraduate film programs at New York University's Tisch School of the Arts, Temple University, and the School of Visual Arts in New York City.

Filmography

Director 

 1979: Space Coast (Documentary)
 1981: Resident Exile (Documentary short)
 1984: Silver Valley (Documentary short)
 1994: Jupiter's Wife (Documentary)
1996: No Accident
 2001: W.I.S.O.R. (Documentary)
2003: The Sightseer (unreleased documentary)
 2005: Methadonia (Documentary)
 2010: I'm Dangerous with Love (Documentary)
 2015: An Autobiography of Michelle Maren (Documentary)

Awards and accolades

References 

Film producers from New York (state)